The office of the vice president of Mexico was first created by the Constitution of 1824, then it was abolished in 1836 by the Seven Constitutional Laws, then briefly restored in 1846 following the restoration of the Constitution of 1824 and lasted a year until 1847 where it was again abolished through a constitutional amendment, it was later restored in 1904 through an amendment to the Constitution of 1857, before being finally abolished by the current Constitution of 1917. Many Mexican vice presidents acted as president during time between the end of the First Mexican Empire and the establishment of the Second Mexican Empire.

Vice presidents of Mexico
Parties

See also
President of Mexico
List of heads of state of Mexico

References

List
Mexico
Mexico